Suriname is located in the northern part of South America and is part of Caribbean South America, bordering the North Atlantic Ocean, between French Guiana and Guyana. It is mostly covered by tropical rainforest, containing a great diversity of flora and fauna that, for the most part, are increasingly threatened by new development. There is a relatively small population, most of which live along the coast.

Location

Geographic coordinates: 

Continent:
South America

Area
Total:

Land:

Water:

Area - comparative:
See order of magnitude 1 E+11 m². Slightly larger than Tunisia.

Land boundaries

Total:

Border countries:
Brazil - 
French Guiana - 
Guyana - 

Coastline:

Maritime claims
Exclusive economic zone:
 and 

Territorial sea:

Climate and climate change

Suriname has a tropical rainforest climate and a tropical monsoon climate, with hot humid conditions year-round.

Climate change  in both Suriname and the wider world is leading to hotter temperatures and more extreme weather. As a fairly poor country, its contributions to global climate change have been limited. Suriname has a large forest cover, the country has been running a carbon negative economy since 2014. Hotter temperatures and changes in precipitation trends are predicted because of climate change.

Terrain
Most of the country is made up of rolling hills, but there is a narrow coastal plain that has swampy terrain.

A recent global remote sensing analysis suggested that there were 781km² of tidal flats in Suriname, making it the 34th ranked country in terms of tidal flat area. 

Elevation extremes

Highest point: Juliana Top -

Natural resources
Timber, hydropower, fish, forests, hydroelectric potential, kaolin, shrimp, bauxite and gold. Small amounts of nickel, copper, platinum and iron ore. It also has sizeable oil.

Water
The country has one large reservoir, the Brokopondo Reservoir. Several rivers run through it, including the Suriname River, Nickerie River and Maroni or Marowijne River.

Land use
(2005 Estimates)

Arable land:
0.36%
Permanent crops:
0.06%
Other:
99.58%

Irrigated land
 (2003)

Natural hazards
Tropical Showers, no hurricanes.

Environment

Current issues
Deforestation is a real problem as timber is cut for export. There is also a lot of pollution of inland waterways by small-scale mining activities.

Climate change

International agreements
Suriname has agreed to the following agreements:
Biodiversity, Climate Change, Endangered Species, Law of the Sea, Marine Dumping, Ozone Layer Protection, Ship Pollution, Tropical Timber 94, Wetlands, Whaling

Extreme points 

 Northernmost point – Oostelijke Polders
 Southernmost point – Border with Brazil Coeroeni
 Westernmost point – Border with Guyana, Sipaliwini District
 Easternmost point – Border with French Guiana, Sipaliwini District
 Highest point – Julianatop: 1,230 m
 Lowest point – unnamed location on the coastal plain: -2 m

References

External links
"Guyana, or, the Kingdom of the Amazons" is a map from the 1600s of what is now known as Suriname